Fashand or Pashand  is a village in Savojbolagh County, Alborz Province, Iran. At the 2006 census, its population was 1,948, in 531 families.  
The language of people is Persian and their dialect is from <<Tati>>'s Family.

Notable people 

 Mahmoud Bahmani

References 

Populated places in Savojbolagh County